Coryphopterus glaucofraenum, the bridled goby, is a species of goby native to the Western Atlantic Ocean and the Caribbean Sea from North Carolina to Brazil. This species can reach a length of  TL. It occasionally makes its way into the aquarium trade.

References

External links
 

Gobiidae
Fish of the Atlantic Ocean
Fish described in 1863
Taxa named by Theodore Gill